Tudjaat were Madeleine Allakariallak and Phoebe Atagotaaluk, two Inuit women from Nunavut, Canada who are known for their recordings and performances of traditional Inuit throat singing.

History

Tudjaat was founded in 1994 after producer Randall Prescott heard Allakariallak perform as part of a backup chorus with Susan Aglukark's third CD.  When he learned that Atagotaaluk, her cousin, was also a throat singer, he arranged to have the pair brought together with several backup musicians for a recording session which combined their traditional singing with modern guitar, keyboard, bass and drum music.  The result was a six-track CD titled Tudjaat.

Tudjaat features "Kajusita (When My Ship Comes In)", a song written by Allakariallak, Jon Park-Wheeler, and Randall Prescott.  The song, which describes the forced exile of a group of Inuit to the High Arctic in the last century, is a tribute to those who suffered and died as a consequence of a government decision.

"Kajusita" won the CD's its producers the 1997 American Indian Film Institute Awards Best Song award, was included on a United Nations compilation CD entitled Here and Now, A celebration of Canadian Music, The Music of The First Peoples and Folk Music, and was made into a music video. Tudjaat was nominated for a Juno Award for Best Music of Aboriginal Canada in 1997, but did not win.

The next year Tudjaat's "Qingauiit", written by Jon Park-Wheeler and Randall Prescott, was included on Putumayo's A Native American Odyssey: Inuit to Inca.  Also that year the pair's singing was featured on Robbie Robertson's CD Contact from the Underworld of Redboy.
After the short-lived career of Tudjaat, Allakariallak worked for the CBC Northern Service and then in 2005 became a news host on the Aboriginal Peoples Television Network.

References

" Reviewed Work: Heartbeat 2: More Voices of First Nations Women by Howard Bass, Rayna Green". Review by: Beverley Diamond Ethnomusicology Vol. 47, No. 3 (Autumn, 2003), pp. 414–417

Musical groups established in 1994
Musical groups from Nunavut
Canadian folk music groups
Inuit throat singing
Inuit musical groups
Women in Nunavut
1994 establishments in Canada